The  series is a Japanese  manga series by Ayane Ukyō under the pseudonym Aya Sakyō. The Kuroneko Kareshi series was serialized in the bimonthly manga magazine Dear+ since 2012.

Plot

0.001% of the human population are werecats, where they are able to shapeshift into cats. One of them, Shingo, is able to shapeshift into a black cat, which he keeps as a secret. During work one day, Shingo meets Keiichi Kagami, one of the most famous actors in Japan, who quickly takes an interest in him. As Kagami seduces Shingo, he not only reveals he is aware Shingo is a werecat, but he also admits that he is able to shapeshift into a leopard. Shingo initially rejects Kagami, but he gradually starts finding himself attracted to him.

Characters

Shingo is a 24-year-old contractor builder who is able to shapeshift into a black cat. He leads a sexually active life and is particularly mischievous, but he fears being left alone ever since he was abandoned as a child.

Keiichi is a 28-year-old actor who is able to shapeshift into a leopard.

Eugine is Keiichi's older brother. Because his leopard genes are mainly recessive, he is unable to completely shapeshift into a leopard.

Takamizawa is Keiichi's childhood friend and personal butler. He has housecat genes, but since they are not dominant, he is not able to shapeshift at all.

Media

Manga

The Kuroneko Kareshi series is written and illustrated by Ayane Ukyō under the pseudonym Aya Sakyō. It is serialized in the bimonthly magazine Dear+ beginning in 2012. The chapters were later released in 9 bound volumes by Shinshokan under the Dear+ Comics imprint. The series is a spin-off of Ukyō's previous series, Nekoka Danshi no Shitsukekata and Nekoka Kareshi no Ayashikata.

Kuroneko Kareshi no Aishikata began in the October 2014 issue. Kuroneko Kareshi no Afurekata began in 2015 and ended in the June 2016 issue.

A drama CD adaptation of Kuroneko Kareshi no Nakasekata was released on October 31, 2014.

Spin-off

Reception

In 2014, Kuroneko Kareshi no Amaekata was ranked #8 in Chil Chil's Boys' Love Awards in the Top 20 Manga category. Kuroneko Kareshi no Aishikata was ranked #3 on the list of recommended boys' love stories in a survey of 470 employees across 400 bookstores nationwide in Japan. In 2019, the entire Kuroneko Kareshi series was ranked #3 in the top 100 boys' love manga on BookLive!, a digital book distributor.

References

Shinshokan manga
Yaoi anime and manga